The 2016 Pro Mazda Championship was the 18th season in series history. The season will begin on March 12 at the Grand Prix of St. Petersburg and end on September 11 at Monterey Grand Prix.

Patricio O'Ward dominated the first half of the season, winning six of the first seven races (and finishing second in the remaining race), vaulting himself into a huge points lead. However, his Team Pelfrey teammate Aaron Telitz vaulted himself back into contention by winning the next four races while O'Ward faltered. Both drivers won one of the three races during the final race weekend but Telitz's non-winning finishes were higher and he won the championship by 28 points. Reigning U.S. F2000 National Championship champion Nico Jamin swept the weekend at the Mid-Ohio Sports Car Course and finished third in the championship, well back. The only other driver to win a race was Argentinean Nicolas Dapero who captured his maiden victory in the penultimate race of the season and finished fifth in points, behind Will Owen who finished on the podium in eight of the sixteen races but failed to win.

American Bobby Eberle won the National Class championship, largely uncontested.

Drivers and teams

Race calendar and results

Championship standings

Drivers' championship
 
 Ties in points broken by number of wins, or best finishes.

Teams' championship

See also
2016 IndyCar Series season
2016 Indy Lights season

References

External links
 

Pro Mazda Championship
Indy Pro 2000 Championship